This is a list of the National Register of Historic Places listings in Madison County, Texas.

This is intended to be a complete list of properties and districts listed on the National Register of Historic Places in Madison County, Texas. There is one property listed on the National Register in the county. This property is also a designated Recorded Texas Historic Landmark.

Current listings

The locations of National Register properties may be seen in a mapping service provided.

|}

See also

National Register of Historic Places listings in Texas
Recorded Texas Historic Landmarks in Madison County

References

External links

Madison County, Texas
Madison County
Buildings and structures in Madison County, Texas